The Chapa pygmy dormouse or Vietnamese pygmy dormouse (Typhlomys cinereus chapensis) is a rodent endemic to Vietnam. It is listed as a critically endangered species. It is often considered a separate species, but is now recognized as a subspecies of the Chinese pygmy dormouse (T. cinereus).

References
  Listed as Critically Endangered (CR B1+2 cd v2.3)

Oriental dormice
Mammals described in 1932
Taxobox trinomials not recognized by IUCN 

it:Typhlomys chapensis